Tribute Spirits is a tribute album released on May 1, 1999 in memory of Japanese rock musician hide. It collects cover versions of his songs by various artists, among them most members of hide's former band X Japan.

It reached number one on the Oricon chart. By the end of 1999 it sold 783,760 copies, making it the 31st best-selling album of the year. It was certified double platinum by RIAJ in May 1999. As of 2005, it was the top-selling tribute album in Japan.

Track listing

References

Tribute albums
1999 compilation albums
Hide (musician)